Gelao (autonym: Kláo, Chinese: 仡佬 Gēlǎo, Vietnamese: Cờ Lao) is a Kra language in the Kra–Dai language family. It is spoken by the Gelao people in southern China and northern Vietnam. Despite an ethnic population of 580,000 (2000 census of China), only a few thousand still speak Gelao in China. Estimates run from 3,000 in China by Li in 1999, of which 500 are monolinguals, to 7,900 by Edmondson in 2008. Edmondson (2002) estimates that the three Gelao varieties of Vietnam have only about 350 speakers altogether.

External relationships
Like Buyang, another Kra language, Gelao contains many words which are likely to be Austronesian cognates. (See Austro-Tai languages.)

As noted by Li and Zhou (1999), Gelao shares much vocabulary with the Hlai and Ong Be languages, suggesting contact with Pre-Hlai speakers before their migration to Hainan.

Demographics

China
Zhang Jimin estimated a total of over 10,000 Gelao speakers in the early 1990s, while Li Jinfang places this number at 3,000 in 1999. Jerold A. Edmondson's 2008 estimate is 7,900 speakers. This number is rapidly declining, as the Gelao are intermarrying with the neighboring Han, Bouyei, and Miao. Many Gelao speakers can also speak Bouyei, Zhuang, or Miao, and nearly all can speak local varieties of Chinese. Among Gelao-speaking families, most middle-age Gelao have very limited speaking abilities for Gelao, while much of the younger generation cannot even understand the most simple words and phrases.

A divergent variety of Gelao known as Shuicheng Gelao 水城仡佬语 (also known as Datie Gelao 打铁仡佬语;) is spoken in Dongkou 洞口村, Houchang Township 猴场乡 and Datiezhai 打铁寨, Miluo Township 米箩乡, both located in Shuicheng County, Guizhou Province, China (Li & Yang 2016: 71). The Gelao of Datiezhai reported that they had migrated from Dongkou 4 generations ago. Li & Yang (2016) report that there are only 3 speakers of Shuicheng Gelao left.

The Mulao number 28,000 people, and are distributed in Majiang, Kaili, Huangping, Duyun, Weng'an, Fuquan, and other counties of southeastern Guizhou. The Mulao of Xuanwei and Jidong villages refer to themselves as the Mu, and in Longli village 龙里寨 they call themselves . The Mulao speak a variety of Gelao, not the Mulam language of Guangxi, which is also called Mulao. One dialect is represented by the datapoints of Bamaozhai 巴茅寨 and Madizhai 马碲寨 of Xuanwei District 宣威区, Majiang County (Luo 1997:105, 115), and the other by Bailazhai 白腊寨, Lushan Town 炉山镇, Kaili City (Luo 1997:189); the latter is also spoken in Dafengdong 大风洞, Pingliang 平良, and Chong'anjiang 重安江. Mulao data from Majiang and Kaili are also given in Guizhou (1985).

The extinct Tuman language (土蛮语) of Sinan County, Guizhou was a variety of Gelao.

Hsiu (2017) reports a Wai Gelao (Chinese: 歪仡佬语, "Crooked Gelao") language variety from Dingjiapo 丁家坡, Mugang Village 木杠村, Muyang Town 木央镇, Funing County, Yunnan. One 83-year-old woman remembered a few kinship terms.

In Qingzhen City, A'ou Gelao is spoken in the following villages (Qingzhen 2004:25-30).
Luohang village 落夯村
Mahuang village 蚂蟥村, Wangzhuang Township 王庄布依族苗族乡
Yinqiao village 银桥村, Weicheng Town 卫城镇
Yangshan village 阳山村, Anliu Township 暗流乡

Zhou (2004) reports that there are no more than 6,000 Gelao speakers, making up only 1.2% of the total number of ethnic Gelao people. The following table, based on Zhou (2004:150–151), shows the number of Gelao speakers in each county as of the 1990s. All counties are in Guizhou province unless specified otherwise.

The Gelao people in the following counties do not speak any form of the Gelao language whatsoever, and have shifted entirely to Southwestern Mandarin.

Vietnam

The most endangered variety, Red Gelao of Vietnam, is spoken by only about 50 people. Many speakers have shifted to Southwestern Mandarin or Hmong. Edmondson (1998) reports that there are also Red Gelao people in Cán Tí, Quản Bạ District and Túng Sán, Hoàng Su Phì District who no longer speak any Gelao, and speak Hmong, Tay, or Vietnamese instead. Hoang (2013:12) reports that there also some Red Gelao in Vĩnh Hảo commune, Bắc Quang District who had moved from Túng Sán commune. However, the White Gelao of Phố La Village and Sính Lủng Village of Dồng Văn District still speak the White Gelao language.

Varieties
Gelao is not well documented, having only been studied by a few scholars such as Li Jinfang, Jerold A. Edmondson, Weera Ostapirat, and Zhang Jimin. The three varieties in Vietnam are not mutually intelligible, and three varieties in China may be distinct languages as well. Ethnologue classifies Gelao as four languages, perhaps as closely related to the two Lachi languages as they are to each other.

Ostapirat (2000), Edmondson (2008)
Ostapirat (2000) proposed three major subdivisions for Gelao, with a total of 17 varieties. The Central and Southwestern branches shares various phonological innovations, suggesting an initial split with the Northern branch. Some varieties cited are also from Jerold A. Edmondson (2008). Edmondson also proposes that Red Gelao of the China-Vietnam border may in fact constitute a separate primary branch of Gelao.

Central (Gao)
Wanzi 弯子寨, Anshun 安顺, Guizhou (also spoken in Heizhai 黑寨)
Dagouchang 大狗场, Huolong 活龙乡, Pingba 平坝, Guizhou
Xinzhai 新寨, Baiyan 白岩乡, Puding 普定, Guizhou (also spoken in Wozi 窝子)
Sanchong (三冲村), Longlin (隆林县), Guangxi
Green Gelao of Hoàng Su Phì, Vietnam

Northern (Red Gelao)
Qiaoshang 桥上, Xiongjiazhai 熊家寨乡, Longchang 龙场区, Zhijin 织金, Guizhou
Bigong 比贡, Dingqi 丁旗乡, Zhenning 镇宁, Guizhou
Longli 龙里, Majiang 麻江, Guizhou (Zhang calls this dialect Mulao 木佬; autonym:  嘎窝); there are two dialects (Bo Wenze 2003):
Xiasi 下司 (in Longlizhai 龙里寨, etc.) and Longshan 龙山 (in Bamaozhai 芭茅寨 of Fuxing 复兴村, Huangtuzhai 黄土寨 of Wengpao 翁袍村, Bailazhai 白腊寨, etc.) of Majiang County
Lushan 炉山, Chongbaizhai 重摆寨 of Dafengdong 大风洞 (autonym:  类窝), and Pingliang 平良 of Kaili City; Chang'anjiang 长安江 of Huangping County
Longjia 龙家寨, Zhijin 织金, Guizhou

Southwestern (White and Green Gelao)
Laozhai 老寨, Malipo 麻栗坡, Yunnan (related dialects spoken in Yueliangwan 月亮弯 of Yangwan township 杨万乡; Fengyan 峰岩 of Dongdu village 董度村; Chongba 铳八 of Donggan 董干乡)
Ban Ma Che, Đồng Văn, Hà Giang, Vietnam
White Gelao of Hà Giang Province: Đồng Vǎn, Hoàng Su Phì, Quản Bạ, and Mèo Vạc districts
Red Gelao of Fanpo (翻坡), Malipo (麻栗坡县), Yunnan (?)
Moji 摩/磨/么基, Longlin 隆林, Guangxi in 上冲 Shangchong and 下冲 Xiachong (< 400 speakers; near Dashuijing 大水井; related dialects in Wantao 弯桃 and Zhe'ai 者艾 of Yancha 岩茶乡)
Niupo 牛坡, Liuzhi 六枝, Guizhou (most populous; also spoken in Machang 马场镇 of Puding 普定县 and Agong 阿弓镇 of Zhijin 织金县; Judu 居都, Yanjiao 岩脚, Houzitian 猴子田, Langjiaba 郞家坝, and Duojiao 堕脚 of Liuzhi 六枝)
Datiezhai 打铁寨, Shuicheng 水城, Guizhou (also spoken in Gaoshi 高石 and Miluo 米箩)
Dingyinshao 定银哨, Zhenning 镇宁, Guizhou
Pudi 普底, Dafang 大方, Guizhou (also spoken in Hongfeng 红丰村)
Jianshan 尖山, Zunyi 遵义, Guizhou (also spoken in Pingzheng 平正, Zunyi along with Red and Green Gelao; fewer than 500 speakers)
Qinglong 青龙, Zunyi 遵义, Guizhou
Sanchong 三冲村, Longlin 隆林, Guangxi (grouped as Central by Shen Yumay and Jerold A. Edmondson)

Zhang (1993)
Zhang Jimin (1993) recognizes the following subdivisions of Gelao.

Central 黔中方言 (10,000 speakers)
Xinzhai subdialect 普定县新寨土语: spoken in Xinzhai 新寨, Wozi 窝子, Changchong 长冲, and Weiqi 未七 villages in Baiyan District 白岩区, Puding District 普定县.
Xiongzhai subdialect 织金熊寨土语: spoken in Qiaoshang Village 桥上村, Xiongjiazhai Township 熊家寨乡, Longchang District 龙场区, Zhijin County 织金县.
North-Central 黔中北方言 (14,000 speakers)
Subdialect 1: spoken in Yatang 亚塘, Maoba District 茅坝区, Renhuai City 仁怀县; and Shanbeihou Village 山背后村, Liangshui Township 凉水, Qinglong County; and Sanchong 三冲, Longlin County 隆林县, Guangxi. Also spoken by the Green Gelao 青仡佬 of Yangliu Village 杨柳村, Renhuai City 仁怀县.
Subdialect 2: spoken by the Red Gelao 红仡佬 of Banliwan 板栗湾, Maoba District 茅坝区, Renhuai City 仁怀县; and some villages of Pingzheng Township 平正乡, Zunyi County 遵义县 (autonym: , where  means 'people'), including in Tianba 田坝, Heijiaoyan 黑脚岩, Pingzheng Township.
Southwestern 黔西南方言 (12,000 speakers)
Niupo subdialect 六枝牛破土语: spoken in Duoque 堕脚, Houzitian 猴子田, and Langjiaba 郎家坝 of Liuzhi Special District 六枝特区; Shangguan 上关 and Xiaguan 下关 in Yingpan Town 营盘镇, Machang District 马场区, Puding County 普定县 (elderly rememberers only); some villages in Agong District 阿弓区, Zhijin County 织金县.
Moji subdialect 隆林么基土语: spoken in Dashuijing 大水井, Longlin County 隆林县, Guangxi and other nearby villages. 400 speakers.
Laozhai subdialect 麻栗坡县老寨土语: spoken in Laozhai 老寨 and Yueliangwan 月亮湾 in Tiechang District 铁厂区, Malipo County 麻栗坡县
Datiezhai subdialect 水城大铁寨土语: spoken in Gaoshi Township 高石乡, Yangmei District 杨梅区 and Ega Township 俄嘎乡, Miluo District 米箩区, Shuicheng County 水城特区 (elderly rememberers only).
Jianshan subdialect 遵义尖山土语: spoken in Jianshan 尖山, Pingzheng Township 平正乡, Zunyi County 遵义县. Under 500 speakers.
Western 黔西方言 (15,000 speakers)
Pudi subdialect 大方县普底土语: spoken in Hongfeng Village 红丰村, Pudi Township 普底乡, Dafang County; Lannigou 滥泥沟, Shajing Township 沙井乡, Qianxi County; a few villages in Daguan District 大观区, Qianxi County; Dazhai 大寨 and Gaokanzhai 高坎寨 in Fenghuang Village 凤凰村, Xinfa Township 新发乡, Qingzhen City; Maixiang 麦巷 and Houzhai 后寨 townships, Qingzhen City
Bigong subdialect 镇宁比贡土语: spoken in Bigong Village 比贡村 and Maocao 茅草 in Mafang Township 新房乡, Anxi District 安西区, Zhenning County 镇宁县

Bradley (2007), He (1983)
The Encyclopedia of the World's Endangered Languages (2007), based on information from He (1983), groups Gelao into five subdivisions.

Hakhi (哈给 Hagei, Green Gelao): west-central Guizhou, western Guangxi, southeastern Yunnan, northern Vietnam - including Yangliu (杨柳) variety in Renhuai County; southwestern Gelao of Sanchong (三冲) and Qinglong (青龙). Hagei varieties are also spoken in Ma'ao (麻凹村), Guanling County (关岭县), Pomao (坡帽) in Zhenfeng County (贞丰县), and Pingzheng Gelao Village (平正仡佬族乡), Zunyi (遵义). Estimated by Jiashan He (1983) at 1,700 speakers. He (1983) also lists Anliang 安良 and Taiyang 太阳 of Renhuai 仁怀县, Huajiangzhen 花江镇 and Ma'ao 麻垇 of Zhenning 镇宁县, Dingying 顶营 of Guanling 关岭县, Maixiang 麦巷 near Qingzhen 清镇, and Liangshuiying 凉水营 of Qinglong 晴隆县 as Hagei-speaking places.
Tolo (多罗 Duoluo, White Gelao): west-central Guizhou, western Guangxi, southeastern Yunnan, northern Vietnam; all other southwestern Gelao varieties. The Niupo variety is also spoken in Machang village (马场镇), Puding County (普定县), Anshun, as well as Agong village (阿弓镇), Zhijin County (织金县), Bijie. The Datiezhai variety is spoken in Gaoshi (高石) of Shuicheng (水城) and Miluo (米箩) of Shuicheng (水城). Estimated by Jiashan He (1983) at 1,200 speakers.
A-uo (阿欧 A'ou/Ao, Red Gelao): west-central Guizhou, western Guangxi, southeastern Yunnan, northern Vietnam - including Banli (板栗湾) variety in Renhuai County; all northern Gelao varieties, as well as southwestern Gelao of Puding County (普定县) and Maocaozhai (茅草寨), Zhijin County (织金县). Estimated by Jiashan He (1983) at 1,500 speakers. He (1983) also lists Shawo 沙窝, Xinkaitian 新开田, Lannigou 滥泥沟 (all in Qianxi 黔西县) as A'ou-speaking places.
Aqao (稿 Gao): west-central Guizhou; all central Gelao varieties. Estimated by Jiashan He (1983) at 2,000 speakers. He (1983) also listed Dongkou 洞口 of Shuicheng 水城县 and Niudong 牛洞 of Zhijin 织金县 as Gao-speaking places.
Qaw: Gulin County (古蔺县), Sichuan; mostly unattested. This dialect is spoken by the Yi (羿人), who are the least-known Gelao subgroup.

The most extensively studied varieties are the Wanzi and Zhenfeng dialects, while the most endangered one is Red Gelao.

Zhou (2004)
Zhou (2004) lists four dialects of Gelao.

Primarily spoken in Renhuai, Zhenning, Guanling, Qinglong, Zhenfeng, and Longlin Counties.
Pomao 坡帽村, Zhenfeng 贞丰县
Primarily spoken in Liuzhi District, Puding, Longlin, and Malipo Counties.
Qingkou 箐口彝族仡佬族布依族乡, Liuzhi 六枝特区
Machang 马场寨, Puding (extinct)
Mengzhou 猛舟村, Puding (extinct)
Primarily spoken in Pingba, Anshun, Puding, and Shuicheng Counties. Its 4 dialects are Dagouchang 大狗场 of Pingba, Xinzhai 新寨 of Puding, Dongkou 洞口 of Shuicheng, and Xiongzhai 熊寨 of Zhijin (extinct).
Dongkou 垌口村, Houchang 猴场乡, Shuicheng 水城县
Shuangkeng 双坑村, Puding
Small pockets of speakers left in Zhenning, Dafang, and Qianxi Counties. Its three dialects are Bigong, Hongfeng, and Jianshan.
Shajing 沙井苗族彝族仡佬族乡: Tiele 铁乐村, Dengming 灯明村, Huangni 黄泥村
Huashi 化石, Qianxi
Yang'er 羊儿, Qianxi
Longjia 龙家寨, Zhijin
Mengjia 猛架, Puding
Weicheng 卫城镇, Qingzhen 清镇市
Maixiang 麦巷村, Qingzhen 清镇市
Pingzheng 平正仡佬族乡 (some villages, including Shibanshang 石板上, also called Jianshan 尖山)
Bayang 坝养, Puding (extinct)

Wei (2008)
Wei Mingying (2008:45) classifies the Gelao dialects as follows.

Duoluo 多罗
Vietnam White Gelao 越白
Yueliangwan 月亮湾, Laozhai 老寨
Judu 居都, Moji 磨基, Wantao 湾桃
Gao 稿
Dongkou 洞口, Datiezhai 打铁寨
Xinzhai 新寨
Wanzi 湾子, Dagouchang 大狗场
Hagei 哈给
Sanchong 三冲, Shanbeihou 山背后, Ma'ao 麻垇, Pomao 坡帽, Yangliu 杨柳, Tianba 田坝, Vietnam Green Gelao 越青
A'ou 阿欧
Banliwan 板栗湾
Jianshan 尖山, Malipo Red Gelao 麻红, Vietnam Red Gelao 越红
Hongfeng 红丰, Maixiang 麦巷, Longjiazhai 龙家寨, Houzitian 猴子田
Qiaoshang 桥上, Longli 龙里

Wei (2008: 39-40) classifies the A'ou (Red Gelao) dialects as follows.
A'ou 阿欧方言
Lectal area 1 第一次方言
Longjiazhai-Houzitian dialect 龙家寨、猴子田土语
Lectal area 2 第二次方言
Qiaoshang dialect 桥上土语
Longli dialect 龙里土语
Bigong dialect 比贡土语
Lectal area 3 第三次方言
Jianshan dialect 尖山土语
Banliwan dialect 板栗湾土语

Wei (2008: 39) considers Houzitian 猴子田 Red Gelao to be most closely related to the Gelao variety of Longjiazhai 龙家寨, northern Zhijin County. There are only about 10 ethnic Gelao households in Houzitian. The Gelao speakers of "Donie"  village, Aga Township 阿嘎乡, Shuicheng County 水城县 originally migrated from Houzitian several decades ago; there are only a few elderly rememberers of that variety left.

Hsiu (2013, 2019)
Hsiu (2019) classifies the Gelao language dialects as follows.

Gelao
Red Gelao
Vandu
Vietnam (Vandu) [50 speakers]
Malipo (Uwei) [1 speaker]
Jianshan (Pumuhen) [extinct]
Banliwan [extinct?]
Dingjiapo (?) [extinct]
A'ou
Mulao [extinct]
Majiang
Kaili
Yiren [extinct]
Hongfeng cluster
Hongfeng [30 speakers]
Qingzhen [nearly extinct]
Shajing [extinct?]
Houzitian-Longjiazhai
Houzitian [extinct?; 1 speaker as of 2012]
Longjiazhai [extinct?]
Qiaoshang [extinct?]
Bigong [30 speakers]
Core Gelao
Dongkou Gelao [3 speakers]
White Gelao (Telue)
Judu [1,000+ speakers], Moji [5 speakers]
Malipo, Vietnam
Central Gelao
Hakei [1,000+ speakers]
Renhuai, Pingzheng
Guanling-Qinglong cluser
Pomao
Sanchong
Vietnam
Qau [~1,000 speakers]
Wanzi, Dagouchang
Xinzhai

An earlier classification by Hsiu (2013) classifies the Gelao dialects as follows.

Gelao
Red Gelao
Border (“Vandu”)
Malipo 麻栗坡 (Uwei)
Hà Giang: Vandu, Wandei
Renhuai: Banliwan 板栗湾, Jianshan 尖山
Core (Proto-Kra retroflex > spirant innovation)
Bigong 比贡
Hongfeng 红丰, Shajing 沙井
Houzitian 猴子田
Zhijin: Qiaoshang 桥上, Longchang 龙场
Mulao
Yiren 羿人
White Gelao
Core
Judu 居都
Moji 磨基, Wantao 湾桃
Border: Yueliangwan 月亮湾, Fengyan 峰岩, Laozhai 老寨, Vietnam White Gelao
Central Gelao
Hakei
Guanling-Qinglong cluster: Ma'ao 麻垇, etc.
Pomao 坡帽
Qau
Dagouchang 大狗场
Wanzi 湾子
Xinzhai 新寨
Dongkou 洞口

Phonology
Many Gelao varieties, such as Telue and Vandu, have many uvular and prenasalized consonants. Many varieties also preserve consonant clusters that have been lost in most other related languages. Gelao also shares many phonological features with Bouyei and other neighboring non-Kra languages.

Tones 
Gelao varieties are tonal. Tones can include level tones ( and ), rising tones ( and ), and falling tones ( and ).

Comparisons 
Sound correspondences between the Liuzhi (六枝) and Zhenfeng (贞丰) varieties include:

[Liuzhi : Zhenfeng]

 : 
 : 
 : 
 : 
 :  or 
 :  or

Grammar
Like all of its surrounding languages, Gelao is a head-first, SVO language. Like Buyang, one unusual feature of Gelao is that negatives usually come at the end of a sentence. Reduplication is very common and is used for diminutive or repetitive purposes. Other common features include the use of serial verb constructions and compound nouns. Although numerals and classifiers precede nouns, adjectives (including demonstratives) always follow the noun. Function words, such as prepositions and auxiliary words, are often derived from verbs.

Like Buyang and Dong, Gelao retains many prefixes that have been lost in most other Kra–Dai languages. Zhang (1993:300) notes that the Moji (磨基) Longlin dialect of White Gelao makes especially extensive use of prefixing syllables before nouns, verbs, and adjectives. These prefixes are especially important for reconstruction purposes.

Many words in Gelao are derived from vernacular Southwest Mandarin Chinese. These loanwords are often used interchangeably with native Gelao words. There is also a highly rich system of classifiers.

Gelao also has a rich set of pronouns not attested in other Kra–Dai languages. There are also pronouns referring to one's household in particular.

Manuscripts
In Guizhou, there are several manuscripts that have word lists of Gelao varieties written using Chinese characters.

In 2009, a book allegedly written in a native Gelao script was found in Guizhou, China, but scholarship reveals it is certainly fake.

References

Further reading
 Zhang Jimin 张済民. 1993. Gelao yu yan jiu 仡佬语研究 (A study of Gelao). Guiyang, China: Guizhou People's Press 贵州民族出版社.
 He Jiashan 贺嘉善. 1983. Gelao yu jian zhi 仡佬语简志 (A sketch of Gelao). Beijing: Ethnic Publishing House 民族出版社.
 Ryūichi Kosaka, Guoyan Zhou, Jinfang Li. 仡央语言词汇集/Geyang yu yan ci hui ji. 贵阳市/Guiyang, China: 贵州民族出版社/Guizhou min zu chu ban she, 1998.
 李锦芳/Li, Jinfang and 周国炎/Guoyan Zhou. 仡央语言探索/Geyang yu yan tan suo. Beijing, China: 中央民族大学出版社/Zhong yang min zu da xue chu ban she, 1999.
Li Jinfang [李锦芳]. 2006. Studies on endangered languages in the Southwest China [西南地区濒危语言调查研究]. Beijing: Minzu University [中央民族大学出版社].
 Zhou Guoyan 周国炎. 2004. Gelao zu mu yu sheng tai yan jiu 仡佬族母語生态硏究  (Studies on the linguistic ecology of the Gelao people). Beijing: Ethnic Publishing House 民族出版社.
 Ostapirat, Weera (2000). "Proto-Kra". Linguistics of the Tibeto-Burman Area 23 (1): 1-251
 Shen Yumay. 2003. Phonology of Sanchong Gelao. M.A. Thesis, University of Texas at Arlington.
 Edmondson, J. A., & Solnit, D. B. (1988). Comparative Kadai: linguistic studies beyond Tai. Summer Institute of Linguistics publications in linguistics, no.  86. [Arlington, Tex.]: Summer Institute of Linguistics. 
 Diller, Anthony, Jerold A. Edmondson, and Yongxian Luo ed. The Tai–Kadai Languages. Routledge Language Family Series. Psychology Press, 2008.
 Li Xia; Li Jinfang; Luo Yongxian. 2014. A Grammar of Zoulei, Southwest China. Bern: Peter Lang AG, Internationaler Verlag der Wissenschaften. 
 Samarina, Irina Vladimirovna [Самарина, Ирина Владимировна]. 2011. The Gelao language: materials for a Kadai comparative dictionary [Языки гэлао: материалы к сопоставительному словарю кадайских языко]. Moscow: Academia. 
 Luo Changmu [骆长木]. 2009. Pingzheng Gelao language [平正仡佬语]. Pingzheng, Guizhou: Pingzheng Township Government. (Hagei Gelao dialect spoken in Tianba village 田坝村, Pingzheng Township 平正仡佬族乡. Gelao transcribed in pinyin.)
 Chen Xing [陈兴]. 2013. Gelaoyu hanzi jinyin shidu daquan [仡佬语汉字近音识读大全]. Beijing: Chinese History Press [中国文史出版社]. 
 Chen Zhengjun [陈正军]. 2003. Guizhou Mulaozu lishi wenhua [贵州仫佬族历史文化]. Guiyang: Guizhou People's Press [贵州民族出版社].
 仡佬语研究 
 新寨自然村调查 
 仡佬族简史简志合编 
 仡佬族 
 黔西布依族仡佬族满族百年

External links
 Gelao-language Swadesh vocabulary list of basic words (from Wiktionary's Swadesh-list appendix)
 Recordings of various minority languages of northern Vietnam 
 Bible recordings in Huangniu (黄扭) Longlin Gelao (also known as Sanchong Gelao, Hagei, Green Gelao)
 ztgl.net
 Chinese papers on Gelao
https://web.archive.org/web/20131202233535/http://cema.gov.vn/modules.php?name=Content&op=details&mid=497
ELAR archive of Documentation of Two Gelao Varieties: Zou Lei and A Hou, South West China

Word lists
 ABVD: Gelao (Niupo) word list 
 ABVD: Gelao (Judu) word list 
 ABVD: Gelao (Hongfeng) word list
 ABVD: Gelao (Zhenfeng) word list 
 ABVD: Gelao (Wanzi) word list 
 ABVD: Gelao (Sanchong) word list 

Languages of China
Languages of Vietnam
Kra languages
L